The Bözberg Road Tunnel is a motorway tunnel in Switzerland. The tunnel lies under the Bözberg Pass between Frick and Baden, in the canton of Aargau, and forms part of the A3 motorway from Basel to Sargans.

The tunnel runs roughly parallel to the Bözberg Rail Tunnel.

References 

Road tunnels in Switzerland
Buildings and structures in Aargau